Benefit Busters is a British documentary series, broadcast on Channel 4 during August and September 2009.

External links

http://www.channel4.com/programmes/benefit-busters
http://entertainment.timesonline.co.uk/tol/arts_and_entertainment/tv_and_radio/article6804313.ece
https://www.theguardian.com/culture/2009/aug/21/benefit-busters-review
https://www.independent.co.uk/arts-entertainment/tv/reviews/last-nights-television-benefit-busters-channel-4-br-dolce-vito-ndash-dream-restaurant-channel-4-1775006.html
http://entertainment.timesonline.co.uk/tol/arts_and_entertainment/tv_and_radio/article6800760.ece

2009 British television series debuts
2009 British television series endings
2000s British documentary television series
Channel 4 original programming
Television series by All3Media
English-language television shows